Eva Marie Saint (born July 4, 1924) is an American actress of film, theatre, radio and television. In a career spanning over 70 years, she has won an Academy Award and a Primetime Emmy Award, alongside nominations for a Golden Globe Award and two British Academy Film Awards. Upon the deaths of Olivia de Havilland in 2020 and  Angela Lansbury in 2022, Saint became the oldest living and later earliest surviving Academy Award-winner, and one of the last surviving stars from the Golden Age of Hollywood cinema.

Born in New Jersey and raised in New York, Saint attended Bowling Green State University and began her career as a television and radio actress in the late 1940s. Among her notable early credits, she originated the role of Thelma in Horton Foote's The Trip to Bountiful (1953), originally an NBC telecast before being adapted into the Tony Award-winning play of the same name. For her performance in the stage version, she won an Outer Critics Circle Award. She made her film debut in Elia Kazan's On the Waterfront (1954), opposite Marlon Brando. The film, which received eight Academy Awards, including Best Picture, earned her the Academy Award for Best Supporting Actress and a nomination for the BAFTA Award for Most Promising Newcomer. Establishing her as an immediate star, it is widely considered to be one of the greatest and most influential films ever made.

From then on, Saint appeared in a variety of roles, including That Certain Feeling (1956), opposite Bob Hope; Raintree County (1957), opposite Montgomery Clift and Elizabeth Taylor; and Fred Zinnemann's A Hatful of Rain (1957), opposite Don Murray and Anthony Franciosa, for which she was nominated for the Golden Globe Award for Best Performance by an Actress in a Motion Picture - Drama. One of her most notable roles came playing Eve Kendall opposite Cary Grant in Alfred Hitchcock's North by Northwest (1959). 

Throughout the 1960s, Saint sustained a film presence with appearances in Exodus (1960), alongside Paul Newman; The Russians Are Coming, the Russians Are Coming (1965), alongside Carl Reiner and Alan Arkin; The Sandpiper (1965), which reunited her with Elizabeth Taylor and featured Richard Burton; and John Frankenheimer's Grand Prix (1966).

Saint gained consecutive nominations for the Primetime Emmy Award for Best Actress in a Single Performance for her appearances in the anthology series The Philco Television Playhouse (1954) and Producers' Showcase (1955). Beginning in the 1970s, her film career began to decline, though she garnered praise for her role opposite George Segal in Loving (1970). She gained additional consecutive Primetime Emmy Award nominations for How the West Was Won (1977) and Taxi!!! (1978), and won the Primetime Emmy Award for Outstanding Supporting Actress in a Miniseries or a Special for the miniseries People Like Us (1990). Saint returned to film with Nothing in Common (1986), opposite Tom Hanks, and continued to act occasionally, notably in Superman Returns (2006), voicing Katara in The Legend of Korra (2012–2014) and Winter's Tale (2014) with Colin Farrell.

Early life

Saint was born on July 4, 1924, in Newark, New Jersey, to Quaker parents. Her father was John Merle Saint and her mother was Eva Marie (nee Rice) Saint. She attended Bethlehem Central High School in Delmar, New York, near Albany, graduating in 1942. She was inducted into the high school's hall of fame in 2006. She studied acting at Bowling Green State University and joined Delta Gamma Sorority. During this time she played the lead role in a production of Personal Appearance. A theater on Bowling Green's campus is named after her. She was an active member in the theater honorary fraternity, Theta Alpha Phi, and served as record keeper of the student council in 1944.

Career

Early television career
Saint's introduction to television began as an NBC page. She appeared in the live NBC-TV show Campus Hoopla in 1946–47. Her performances on this program are recorded on rare kinescope, and audio recordings of these telecasts are preserved in the Library of Congress. She also appeared in Bonnie Maid's Versa-Tile Varieties on NBC in 1949 as one of the original singing "Bonnie Maids" used in the live commercials.

Saint appeared in a 1947 Life Magazine special about television, and also in a 1949 feature Life article about her as a struggling actress earning minimum amounts from early TV while trying to make ends meet in New York City. In the late 1940s, Saint continued to make her living by extensive work in radio and television. In 1953, she won the Drama Critics Award for her Broadway stage role in the Horton Foote play The Trip to Bountiful (1953), in which she co-starred with such formidable actors as Lillian Gish and Jo Van Fleet.

In 1955, Saint was nominated for her first Emmy for "Best Actress In A Single Performance" on The Philco Television Playhouse, playing the young mistress of middle-aged E. G. Marshall in Middle of the Night by Paddy Chayefsky. She won another Emmy nomination for the 1955 television musical version of Our Town, adapted from the Thornton Wilder play of the same name. Co-stars were Paul Newman and Frank Sinatra. Her success and acclaim in TV productions were of such a high level that "one slightly hyperbolic primordial TV critic dubbed her 'the Helen Hayes of television.'"

On the Waterfront

Saint made her feature film debut in On the Waterfront (1954), starring Marlon Brando and directed by Elia Kazan—a performance for which she won the Academy Award for Best Supporting Actress. Her performance in the role of Edie Doyle (whose brother's death sets the film's drama in motion), which she won over such leading contenders as Claire Trevor, Nina Foch, Katy Jurado and Jan Sterling, also earned her a British Academy of Film and Television Award nomination for "Most Promising Newcomer". In his review for The New York Times, film critic A. H. Weiler wrote, "In casting Eva Marie Saint—a newcomer to movies from TV and Broadway—Mr. Kazan has come up with a pretty and blond artisan who does not have to depend on these attributes. Her parochial school training is no bar to love with the proper stranger. Amid scenes of carnage, she gives tenderness and sensitivity to genuine romance." The film was a major success and launched Saint's film career. She received $7,500 for the role.

In a 2000 interview in Premiere magazine, Saint recalled making the film, which has been highly influential, saying, "[Elia] Kazan put me in a room with Marlon Brando. He said 'Brando is the boyfriend of your sister. You're not used to being with a young man. Don't let him in the door under any circumstances.' I don't know what he told Marlon; you'll have to ask him—good luck! [Brando] came in and started teasing me. He put me off balance. And I remained off balance for the whole shoot." She repeated the anecdote in a 2010 interview.

Saint appeared alongside Bob Hope in That Certain Feeling (1956) for which she received $50,000. She was then offered $100,000 to star in the lavish Civil War epic Raintree County (1957) with Elizabeth Taylor and Montgomery Clift. After that, she starred with Don Murray in A Hatful of Rain, the pioneering drug-addiction drama, which although made later than Raintree Country was released earlier in 1957. She received a nomination for the "Best Foreign Actress" award from the British Academy of Film and Television for her performance.

North by Northwest

Director Alfred Hitchcock surprised many by choosing Saint over dozens of other candidates for the femme fatale role in what was to become a suspense classic North by Northwest (1959) with Cary Grant and James Mason. Written by Ernest Lehman, the film updated and expanded upon the director's early "wrong man" spy adventures of the 1930s, 1940s, and 1950s, including The 39 Steps, Young and Innocent, and Saboteur. North by Northwest became a box-office hit and an influence on spy films for decades. The film ranks number forty on the American Film Institute's list of the 100 Greatest American Movies of All Time.

Hitchcock worked with Saint to make her voice lower and huskier, and personally chose costumes for her during a shopping trip to Bergdorf Goodman in New York City.

The change in Saint's screen persona, coupled with her adroit performance as a seductive woman of mystery who keeps Cary Grant (and the audience) off balance, was widely heralded. In his review of August 7, 1959, The New York Times critic Abe H. Weiler wrote, "In casting Eva Marie Saint as [Cary Grant's] romantic vis-a-vis, Mr. Hitchcock has plumbed some talents not shown by the actress heretofore. Although she is seemingly a hard, designing type, she also emerges both the sweet heroine and a glamorous charmer."

In 2000, recalling her experience making the picture with Cary Grant and Hitchcock, Saint said, "[Grant] would say, 'See, Eva Marie, you don't have to cry in a movie to have a good time. Just kick up your heels and have fun.' Hitchcock said, 'I don't want you to do a sink-to-sink movie again, ever. You've done these black-and-white movies like On the Waterfront. It's drab in that tenement house. Women go to the movies, and they've just left the sink at home. They don't want to see you at the sink.' In a 2010 interview she stated: "I said, 'I can't promise you that, Hitch, because I love those dramas.'"

Mid-career

Although North by Northwest might have propelled her to the top ranks of stardom, Saint chose to limit her film work in order to spend time with her husband since 1951, director Jeffrey Hayden, and their two children. In the 1960s, Saint continued to distinguish herself in both high-profile and offbeat pictures. She co-starred with Paul Newman in Exodus (1960), a historical drama about the founding of the state of Israel adapted from the novel of the same name by Leon Uris. It was directed by Otto Preminger. She also co-starred with Warren Beatty, Karl Malden and Angela Lansbury as a tragic beauty in the drama All Fall Down (1962). Based upon a novel by James Leo Herlihy and a screenplay by William Inge, the film was directed by John Frankenheimer.

She appeared with Elizabeth Taylor and Richard Burton in the melodrama The Sandpiper for Vincente Minnelli, and with James Garner in the World War II thriller 36 Hours (1965), directed by George Seaton. Saint joined an all-star cast in the comedic satire, The Russians Are Coming, the Russians Are Coming, directed by Norman Jewison, and the international racing drama, Grand Prix (1966) directed by Frankenheimer and presented in Cinerama.

Saint received some of her best reviews for her performance in Loving (1970), co-starring as the wife of George Segal. The film was about a commercial artist's relationship with his wife and other women; it was critically acclaimed but did not have wide viewership.

Because of the mostly second-rate film roles that came her way in the 1970s, Saint returned to television and the stage in the 1980s. She received an Emmy nomination for the 1977 miniseries How The West Was Won and a 1978 Emmy nomination for Taxi!!!. She was reunited with On the Waterfront co-star Karl Malden in the television film Fatal Vision, this time as the wife of his character, as he investigated the murder of his daughter and granddaughters.  She played the mother of Cybill Shepherd in the television series Moonlighting, a role which spanned episodes over three years.

Later career
Saint returned to the big screen for the first time in over a decade in Nothing in Common (1986), in which she played the mother of Tom Hanks's character; it was directed by Garry Marshall. Critics applauded her return to features.

Saint was soon back on the small screen in numerous projects. After receiving five nominations, she won her first Emmy Award for the 1990 miniseries People Like Us. She appeared in a number of television productions in the 1990s and was cast as the mother of radio producer, Roz Doyle, in a 1999 episode of the comedy series Frasier.

In 2000, Saint returned to feature films in I Dreamed of Africa with Kim Basinger. In 2005, she co-starred with Jessica Lange and Sam Shepard in Don't Come Knocking. Also in 2005, she appeared in the family film Because of Winn-Dixie, co-starring AnnaSophia Robb, Jeff Daniels, and Cicely Tyson.

In 2006, Saint appeared in Superman Returns as Martha Kent, the adoptive mother of Superman, alongside Brandon Routh and a computer-generated performance from her On the Waterfront co-star Marlon Brando.

She was presented one of the Golden Boot Awards in 2007 for her contributions to western cinema.

Saint has lent her voice to the 2012 Nickelodeon animated series The Legend of Korra, a sequel to the hit TV show Avatar: The Last Airbender, playing the now-elderly Katara, a main character from the original series.

In September 2012, she was cast as the adult version of Willa in the film adaptation of the novel Winter's Tale by Mark Helprin. The film was released on Valentine's Day 2014.

At the age of 93, Saint appeared at the 2018 Academy Award ceremony to present the award for Costume Design. She received a standing ovation upon entering the stage.

In 2021, Saint appeared alongside Marisa Tomei in the podcast play series "The Pack Podcast" as part of the segment "The Bus Ride".

She has two stars on the Hollywood Walk of Fame, one for motion pictures at 6624 Hollywood Boulevard, and one for television at 6730 Hollywood Boulevard.

Personal life

Saint married producer and director Jeffrey Hayden on October 28, 1951. They had two children together: son Darrell Hayden and daughter Laurette Hayden. Their first child, Darrell, was born two days after she won an Academy Award for On the Waterfront. Saint and Hayden also have four grandchildren and were married for 65 years, until Hayden's death on December 24, 2016, at the age of 90.

Filmography

Film

Television

Awards and nominations

See also
 Lists of American actors
 List of Bowling Green State University alumni

References

External links

Idol Chatter: Eva Marie Saint
On Life Between Brando's Babe and Superman's Mom (Moving Pictures Magazine interview)

Living people
1924 births
Actresses from New York (state)
American film actresses
American stage actresses
American television actresses
American voice actresses
Best Supporting Actress Academy Award winners
Bowling Green State University alumni
Outstanding Performance by a Supporting Actress in a Miniseries or Movie Primetime Emmy Award winners
People from Bethlehem, New York
Actresses from Newark, New Jersey
20th-century American actresses
21st-century American actresses